Kiefersfelden is a municipality with about 7000 inhabitants located in the district of Rosenheim in Bavaria in Germany on the border with Tyrol, Austria.

Geography

Geographical location
Kiefersfelden is located in the foothills of the Alps, in the Bavarian part of the Unterinntal, at an altitude of about  ASL.

The local rivers are the Inn and the Kieferbach.

Nearby places
 Bayrischzell
 Ebbs in Tyrol
 Kufstein in Tyrol
 Oberaudorf
 Thiersee in Tyrol

References

Rosenheim (district)
Populated places on the Inn (river)